Aleksandr Ivanovich Moiseyev (May 28, 1927 – September 9, 2003) was a Russian basketball player who competed for the Soviet Union in the 1952 Summer Olympics. He was Jewish, and trained at Armed Forces sports society in Moscow. and played for CSKA Moscow. He was a member of the Soviet team which won the silver medal. He played all eight matches.

References

External links
Aleksandr Moiseyev's profile at databaseOlympics
Aleksandr Moiseyev's profile at Sport-Strana.ru 

1927 births
2003 deaths
Armed Forces sports society athletes
Basketball players at the 1952 Summer Olympics
FIBA EuroBasket-winning players
Jewish men's basketball players
Medalists at the 1952 Summer Olympics
Olympic basketball players of the Soviet Union
Olympic medalists in basketball
Olympic silver medalists for the Soviet Union
PBC CSKA Moscow players
Russian Jews
Russian men's basketball players
Soviet Jews
Soviet men's basketball players